Belcher Branch is a stream in the U.S. state of West Virginia.

Belcher Branch has the name of H. E. Belcher, a local pioneer settler.

See also
List of rivers of West Virginia

References

Rivers of Mercer County, West Virginia
Rivers of West Virginia